Heteropneustes microps is a species of airsac catfish possibly endemic to Sri Lanka, though  records from India have been made. This fish is a component of local commercial fisheries, and is found in the aquarium trade.

References
 

Fish of Asia
Fish described in 1864
Taxa named by Albert Günther
Taxonomy articles created by Polbot
Taxobox binomials not recognized by IUCN